The Wilbraham at 282–284 Fifth Avenue or 1 West 30th Street, in the NoMad neighborhood of Manhattan, New York City, was built in 1888–90 as a bachelor apartment hotel. Its "bachelor flats" each consisted of a bedroom and parlor, with bathroom but no kitchen; the communal dining room was on the eighth floor. The building's refined and "extraordinarily well detailed" design in commercial Romanesque revival style – which owed much to the Richardsonian Romanesque developed by H.H. Richardson – was the work of the partners David and John Jardine. The Real Estate Record and Guide in 1890 called it "quite an imposing piece of architecture". 

The building is eight stories under a verdigris copper-covered mansard roof, with penthouses and basements, as a result of changes made during its construction. It is clad in Philadelphia brick and brownstone from quarries in Belleville, New Jersey, with wrought- and cast iron. Steel replaced structural cast iron after the foundations were already in place.

The building was commissioned as a real estate investment by the prominent Scottish-American jeweler William Moir. At the time the brownstone-fronted houses along this stretch of Fifth Avenue were being sold by the rich, who were rebuilding, often in more palatial fashion, farther north, in the part of Fifth Avenue that overlooked Central Park, just coming into its first maturity. Still, the neighborhood remained fashionable for clubs, hotels and the first blocks of "French flats". The fashionable purveyors of china and glass Davis Collamore & Co. leased two floors of showrooms.

In 1934–35 the Wilbraham's apartments were remodeled to include kitchens, a mark of changed social habits and gas cooking. It remains in residential use.

In 2004 the Wilbraham was designated a New York City Landmark. In 2018 it was listed on the National Register of Historic Places.

See also

Architecture in New York City
List of New York City Designated Landmarks in Manhattan from 14th to 59th Streets
National Register of Historic Places listings in Manhattan from 14th to 59th Streets

References
Notes

External links

Residential buildings in Manhattan
Residential buildings completed in 1890
Residential buildings on the National Register of Historic Places in Manhattan
New York City Designated Landmarks in Manhattan
Romanesque Revival architecture in New York City
Fifth Avenue